The standard pronunciation of Cantonese is that of Guangzhou, also known as Canton, the capital of Guangdong Province. Hong Kong Cantonese is related to the Guangzhou dialect, and the two diverge only slightly. Yue dialects in other parts of Guangdong and Guangxi provinces, such as Taishanese, may be considered divergent to a greater degree.

Syllables
A syllable generally corresponds to a word or a character. Most syllables are etymologically associated with either standard Chinese characters or colloquial Cantonese characters. Modern linguists have discovered that about 1,760 syllables are used in Cantonese and cover the pronunciations of more than 10,000 Chinese characters. Therefore, there is an average of six homophonous characters per syllable.

Phonetically, a Cantonese syllable has only two parts: the sound and the tone.

Sounds
A Cantonese syllable usually consists of an initial (onset) and a final (rime/rhyme). There are about 630 syllables in the Cantonese syllabary.
 

Initial consonants
Initials (or onsets) refer to the 19 initial consonants which may occur at the beginning of a sound. Some sounds have no initials and they are said to have null initial. The following is the inventory for Cantonese as represented in IPA:

Note the aspiration contrast and the lack of voicing contrast for stops. The affricates are grouped with the stops for compactness in the chart.

Historically, there was another series of alveolo-palatal sibilants as discussed below.

Vowels and finals

Finals (or rimes/rhymes) are the part of the sound after the initial. A final is typically composed of a main vowel (nucleus) and a terminal (coda).

Eleven vowel analysis 
As the traditionally transcribed near-close finals have been found to be pronounced in the mid region on acoustic findings, some sources such as  prefer to analyze them as close-mid which results in eleven vowel phonemes. In this analysis, vowel length is a key contrastive feature of the vowels.

The following chart lists all the finals in Cantonese as represented in IPA.

Eight vowel analysis 

In this analysis, vowel length is mainly allophonic and is contrastive only in the open vowels.

The following chart lists all the finals in Cantonese as represented in IPA.

Other notes 

They are absent from some analyses and romanization systems.

The diphthongal ending  is rounded after rounded vowels. Nasal consonants can occur as base syllables in their own right and these are known as syllabic nasals. The stop consonants are unreleased.

When the three checked tones are separated, the stop codas  become allophones of the nasal codas  respectively, because they are in complementary distribution, the former three appearing in the checked tones and the latter three in the non-checked tones.

Tones

Like other Chinese dialects, Cantonese uses tone contours to distinguish words, with the number of possible tones depending on the type of final. While Guangzhou Cantonese generally distinguishes between high-falling and high level tones, the two have merged in Hong Kong Cantonese and Macau Cantonese, yielding a system of six different tones in syllables ending in a semi-vowel or nasal consonant. (Some of these have more than one realization, but such differences are not used to distinguish words.) In finals that end in a stop consonant, the number of tones is reduced to three; in Chinese descriptions, these "checked tones" are treated separately by diachronic convention, so that Cantonese is traditionally said to have nine tones. However, phonetically these are a conflation of tone and final consonant; the number of phonemic tones is six in Hong Kong and seven in Guangzhou.

For purposes of meters in Chinese poetry, the first and fourth tones are the "flat/level tones", while the rest are the "oblique tones". This follows their regular evolution from the four tones of Middle Chinese.

The first tone can be either high level or high falling usually without affecting the meaning of the words being spoken. Most speakers are in general not consciously aware of when they use and when to use high level and high falling. In Hong Kong, most speakers have merged the high level and high falling tones. In Guangzhou, the high falling tone is disappearing as well, but is still prevalent among certain words, e.g. in traditional Yale Romanization with diacritics, sàam (high falling) means the number three , whereas sāam (high level) means shirt .

The relative pitch of the tones varies with the speaker; consequently, descriptions vary from one sources to another. The difference between high and mid level tone (1 and 3) is about twice that between mid and low level (3 and 6): 60 Hz to 30 Hz. Low falling (4) starts at the same pitch as low level (6), but then drops; as is common with falling tones, it is shorter than the three level tones. The two rising tones, (2) and (5), both start at the level of (6), but rise to the level of (1) and (3), respectively.

The tone 3, 4, 5 and 6 are dipping in the last syllable when in an interrogative sentence or an exclamatory sentence.  "really?" is pronounced .

The numbers "394052786" when pronounced in Cantonese, will give the nine tones in order (Romanization (Yale) saam1, gau2, sei3, ling4, ng5, yi6, chat7, baat8, luk9), thus giving a mnemonic for remembering the nine tones.

Like other Yue dialects, Cantonese preserves an analog to the voicing distinction of Middle Chinese in the manner shown in the chart below.

The distinction of voiced and voiceless consonants found in Middle Chinese was preserved by the distinction of tones in Cantonese. The difference in vowel length further caused the splitting of the dark entering tone, making Cantonese (as well as other Yue Chinese branches) one of the few Chinese varieties to have further split a tone after the voicing-related splitting of the four tones of Middle Chinese.

Cantonese is special in the way that the vowel length can affect both the rime and the tone. Some linguists believe that the vowel length feature may have roots in the Old Chinese language.

There are also two changed tones, which add the diminutive-like meaning "that familiar example" to a standard word. For example, the word for "silver" (ngan4) in a modified tone (ngan2) means "coin". In addition, modified tones are used in compounds, reduplications ( kam4 kam4 cheng1 > kam4 kam2 cheng1 "in a hurry") and direct address to family members ( mui6 mui6 > mui4 mui2 "sister"). The two modified tones are high level, like tone 1, and mid rising, like tone 2, though for some people not as high as tone 2. The high level changed tone is more common for speakers with a high falling tone; for others, mid rising (or its variant realization) is the main changed tone, in which case it only operates on those syllables with a non-high level and non-mid rising tone (i.e. only tones 3, 4, 5 and 6 in Yale and Jyutping romanizations may have changed tones). However, in certain specific vocatives, the changed tone does indeed result in a high level tone (tone 1), including speakers without a phonemically distinct high falling tone.

Historical change
Like other languages, Cantonese is constantly undergoing sound change, processes where more and more native speakers of a language change the pronunciations of certain sounds.

One shift that affected Cantonese in the past was the loss of distinction between the alveolar and the alveolo-palatal (sometimes termed as postalveolar) sibilants, which occurred during the late 19th and early 20th centuries. This distinction was documented in many Cantonese dictionaries and pronunciation guides published prior to the 1950s but is no longer distinguished in any modern Cantonese dictionary.

Publications that documented this distinction include:
Williams, S., A Tonic Dictionary of the Chinese Language in the Canton Dialect, 1856.
Cowles, R., A Pocket Dictionary of Cantonese, 1914.
Meyer, B. and Wempe, T., The Student's Cantonese-English Dictionary, 3rd edition, 1947.
Chao, Y. Cantonese Primer, 1947.

The depalatalization of sibilants caused many words that were once distinct to sound the same.  For comparison, this distinction is still made in modern Standard Mandarin, with most alveolo-palatal sibilants in Cantonese corresponding to the retroflex sibilants in Mandarin.  For instance:

Even though the aforementioned references observed the distinction, most of them also noted that the depalatalization phenomenon was already occurring at the time.  Williams (1856) writes:

Cowles (1914) adds:

A vestige of this palatalization difference is sometimes reflected in the romanization scheme used to romanize Cantonese names in Hong Kong. For instance, many names will be spelled with sh even though the "sh sound" is no longer used to pronounce the word. Examples include the surname , which is often romanized as Shek, and the names of places like Sha Tin.

However, Mandarin also retains the medials, where  and  can occur, as can be seen in the examples above. Cantonese had lost its medials sometime ago in its history, reducing the ability for speakers to distinguish its sibilant initials.

In modern-day Hong Kong, many younger speakers do not distinguish between certain phoneme pairs such as  vs.  and  vs. the null initial and merge one sound into another. Although that is often considered substandard and denounced as  "lazy sounds", it is becoming more common and is influencing other Cantonese-speaking regions (see Hong Kong Cantonese). 

Assimilation also occurs in certain contexts: 肚餓 is sometimes read as  not ,  is sometimes read as  not , but sound change of these morphemes are limited to that word.

See also
 Proper Cantonese pronunciation
 Cantonese nasal-stop alternation

Notes

References

 
 
 
 
 
 
 
 
 
 

 
Cantonese language